Eef Mulders (born 28 November 1948) is a Dutch footballer. He played in one match for the Netherlands national football team in 1971.

References

External links
 

1948 births
Living people
Dutch footballers
Netherlands international footballers
Place of birth missing (living people)
Association footballers not categorized by position